Joel Hardin (born in 1940 in Ontario, Oregon) is a former United States Border Patrol inspector and mantracking expert.  He currently teaches tracking through his company Joel Hardin Professional Tracking Services based in Stites, Idaho.

Career

After high school, Joel joined the Idaho Air National Guard and served in the local police department of Emmett, Idaho.  Later, in 1965, Joel joined the United States Border Patrol in which he served for 25 years, protecting both the U.S.-Mexico and U.S.-Canadian borders.  It was during his time on the U.S.-Mexico border that he learned tracking from fellow Border Patrol agents, namely Albert "Ab" Taylor.
Since his retirement from the Border Patrol in 1990, Joel has devoted himself to mantracking, training search and rescue groups, military, law enforcement, and interested individuals.

Notable tracking cases

 1979: assisted apprehension of Artie Ray Baker, ex U.S. special forces member, and his wife after the murder of a U.S. Customs Inspector
 1982: allegedly debunked Bigfoot footprints allegedly faked by a part-time U.S. Forest Service employee at Walla Walla, Washington

Books

 Tracker: Case Files & Adventures of a Professional Mantracker by Joel Hardin with Matt Condon, 2004,

References

External links
 Joel Hardin Professional Tracking Services
 Outside Magazine February 2002 article featuring Joel Hardin
   ABA Article He Tries Men's Soles

People from Ontario, Oregon
1940 births
Living people
United States Border Patrol agents